Johan Rubén Rodríguez Álvarez (born 15 August 1975) is a Mexican former professional footballer who played as a midfielder.

Career
Rodríguez made his football debut in 1996 with Cruz Azul, playing as a tough-tackling defensive midfielder behind international starters Benjamín Galindo and Carlos Hermosillo. The club won the Invierno 1997 championship and the CONCACAF Champions Cup tournaments of 1996 and 1997. However, it was not until he joined Santos in 1999 that he had major opportunities to demonstrate his skills. Rodríguez helped Santos to a runner-up finish in the Verano 2000 tournament and the league title in the Verano 2001 competition. He joined Necaxa in 2004, and later played for Morelia and Querétaro in the later stages of his career.

Rodríguez also represented the Mexico national team, earning 17 caps. Although his first appearance came under Enrique Meza in 2000, in a 2–0 loss to the United States, he is most associated with the era of Javier Aguirre. Rodríguez started in Aguirre's first match in charge of Mexico in 2001, a 1–0 victory over the United States. The result helped turn around a Mexican qualifying effort that had been disastrous up to that point. He scored goals against Liberia and El Salvador in 2001, both in friendly matches, and proceeded to solidify his place in the starting eleven through the 2001 Copa América and 2002 FIFA World Cup. Rodríguez's combative style was less valued by Aguirre's successor, Ricardo Antonio Lavolpe, who preferred Pável Pardo in central midfield, and he was not called up again after Aguirre left the coaching post. His last cap came in the World Cup second-round defeat to the United States on June 17, 2002.

After six months out injured and not having kicked a ball, he found it impossible to find a new club and decided instead to concentrate on his private businesses.

Honours
Cruz Azul
Mexican Primera División: Invierno 1997
Copa México: 1996–97
CONCACAF Champions' Cup: 1996; 1997

Santos Laguna
Mexican Primera División: Verano 2001

Career statistics

International goals

|- 
| 1. || August 23, 2001 || Veracruz, Mexico ||  || 5–4 || Win || Friendly
|- 
| 2. || October 31, 2001 || Puebla, Mexico ||  || 4–1 || Win || Friendly
|}

External links

 Profile
Santos Laguna in Spanish
FIFA profile

References

1975 births
Living people
Footballers from Nuevo León
Association football midfielders
2002 FIFA World Cup players
2001 Copa América players
Mexico international footballers
Cruz Azul footballers
Santos Laguna footballers
Club Necaxa footballers
Atlético Morelia players
Querétaro F.C. footballers
Liga MX players
Twin sportspeople
Mexican twins
Sportspeople from Monterrey
Mexican footballers